The 1984 Ugandan Super League was the 17th season of the official Ugandan football championship, the top-level football league of Uganda.

Overview
The 1984 Uganda Super League was contested by 16 teams and was won by SC Villa, while Bell FC, Lufula and Hodari were relegated.

League standings

Leading goalscorer
The top goalscorer in the 1984 season was Frank Kyazze of Kampala City Council FC with 18 goals.

References

External links
Uganda - List of Champions - RSSSF (Hans Schöggl)
Ugandan Football League Tables - League321.com

Ugandan Super League seasons
Uganda
Uganda
1